Vengadeshwaran (born 23 December 1995) is an Indian cricketer. He made his First-class debut for Puducherry in the 2018–19 Ranji Trophy on 12 November 2018.

References

External links 
 

Living people
1995 births
Indian cricketers
Pondicherry cricketers